Sumerduck  is a small rural village located equidistant between Fredericksburg, Culpeper, and Warrenton, in Fauquier County in the U.S. state of Virginia.

The name was derived from the fact that ducks flocked here in the summer. Sumerduck is home to the major portion of the C.F. Phelps Wildlife Management Area, with several entrances to the reserve off of the major thoroughfare, VA Route 651. The community is also home to Cider Lab (a small batch, craft cidery), Rogers Ford Farm Winery and Smith's Antiques.

The Sumerduck Historic District was listed on the National Register of Historic Places in 2009.

References

Unincorporated communities in Fauquier County, Virginia
Unincorporated communities in Virginia